Mikhail Olegovich Sorochkin (born 20 February 1992) is a Russian football forward.

Club career
He made his debut in the Russian Football National League for FC Angusht Nazran on 5 September 2013 in a game against FC Sibir Novosibirsk.

References

External links
 Career summary by sportbox.ru
 
 
 Player's profile at Crimean Football Union

1992 births
Living people
Russian footballers
Association football forwards
Russian expatriate footballers
Expatriate footballers in Belarus
FC Volga Nizhny Novgorod players
FC Angusht Nazran players
FC Gorodeya players
FC Nizhny Novgorod (2015) players
FC TSK Simferopol players
Belarusian Premier League players
Crimean Premier League players
Sportspeople from Nizhny Novgorod